Prestbury may refer to:

Places
 Prestbury, Cheshire
 Prestbury, Gloucestershire
 Prestbury, a subdivision of Aurora, Illinois

People
 Thomas Prestbury, a medieval English Benedictine abbot and university chancellor